The Crowded Hour is a 1925 American silent drama film directed by E. Mason Hopper and starring Bebe Daniels. It was produced by Famous Players-Lasky and distributed by Paramount Pictures. It is based on the 1918 Broadway play, The Crowded Hour, by Channing Pollock and Edgar Selwyn.

Plot
As described in a film magazine review, Peggy and her pal Matt Wilde are performers in a "Follies" act when Billy Laidlaw sees her and falls in love with her despite the fact that he is already married. When World War I comes, Peggy and her partner become "Y" entertainers in France where she meets Billy. Billy later starts for an ammunition dump, planning to destroy it before the Germans reach it. Peggy is working as a switchboard operator when she finds it a question of saving Billy or a platoon of French soldiers, she chooses the latter. Billy is then captured. Peggy is later blinded during an attack, and then discovers that her nurse is Billy's wife Grace. Peggy stoically resolves to forget Billy and make amends with her partner Matt.

Cast

Preservation
With no prints of The Crowded Hour located in any film archives, it is a lost film.

References

External links

Lobby poster
Lantern slide (archived)

American silent feature films
Lost American films
Films directed by E. Mason Hopper
American films based on plays
Paramount Pictures films
1925 drama films
Silent American drama films
American black-and-white films
Lost drama films
1925 lost films
1920s American films
Films with screenplays by John Russell (screenwriter)
American World War I films
Films set in France
1920s English-language films